Titanopteryx is a genus of fly in the family Simulidae.

Simuliidae
Nematocera genera